Fleet may refer to:

Vehicles
Fishing fleet
Naval fleet
Fleet vehicles, a pool of motor vehicles
Fleet Aircraft, the aircraft manufacturing company

Places

Canada
Fleet, Alberta, Canada, a hamlet

England
The Fleet Lagoon, at Chesil Beach, Dorset
Fleet, Dorset, England, a village and civil parish
Fleet, Hampshire, England, a town and civil parish
Fleet, Hayling Island, Hampshire, England, a hamlet
Fleet Pond, Hampshire, England
River Fleet, subterranean river in London, England
Fleet Street, named after the river
Fleet Prison, named after the river
Fleet Line, named after the river, was the original name for the London Underground Jubillee Line
Fleet, Lincolnshire, England
Fleet (Kent), a term for a waterway in the Thames marshes, England
The Fleet (Tees), a section of the River Tees' original route

Scotland
Water of Fleet, a river in Scotland
Fleet Bay, a part of a National Scenic Area within Dumfries and Galloway, Scotland

United States
Fleet, Kentucky, US, an unincorporated community

In business
 ARC Centre of Excellence in Future Low-Energy Electronics Technologies, also known as FLEET, Australian physics research collaboration developing ultra-low-energy electronics 
Fleet Aircraft, a Canadian manufacturer of aircraft from 1928 to 1957
FleetBoston Financial, a financial institution also known as Fleet Bank
Fleet Farm, American farm and ranch supply store chain
Fleet services, an English motorway service station
Fleet (laxative), brand name for Bisacodyl

People
Fleet (surname)
Moses Fleetwood Walker (1856-1924), nicknamed "Fleet", American baseball player, inventor, and author, credited by some as being the first African American to play Major League Baseball

Other uses
Ebbsfleet United F.C., an English football team whose nickname is "The Fleet"
The Fleet series of shared universe science fiction anthologies edited by David Drake and Bill Fawcett
 Fleet (horse)
 Fleets, a discontinued disappearing messaging feature of the Twitter platform
 Wilmington Clippers (1937–1950), an American football team nicknamed "The Fleet"
 Fleet, an IDE developed by JetBrains s.r.o.

See also
 
 
 The Fleet (disambiguation)
 First fleet (disambiguation)
 Second Fleet (disambiguation)
 Third Fleet (disambiguation)
 Fourth Fleet (disambiguation)
 Fifth Fleet (disambiguation)
 Sixth Fleet (disambiguation)
 Seventh Fleet (disambiguation)
 8th Fleet (disambiguation)
 9th Fleet